The 1950 Bucknell Bison football team was an American football team that represented Bucknell University as an independent during the 1950 college football season. 

In its fourth season under head coach Harry Lawrence, the team compiled a 6–3 record. Richard D. Johnson and Arnold V. Pechulis were the team captains.

The team played its home games at Memorial Stadium on the university campus in Lewisburg, Pennsylvania.

Schedule

References

Bucknell
Bucknell Bison football seasons
Bucknell Bison football